Paulo Moura - Alma Brasileira is a 2013 Brazilian documentary film directed by Eduardo Escorel about the clarinetist and saxophonist Paulo Moura.

The documentary is based on over 40 years of videos and written records. It features 25 songs from the artist repertoire, while Paulo Moura himself gives more details about his musical life and the Brazilian music scene.

References

Brazilian biographical films
Brazilian documentary films
Documentary films about jazz music and musicians
2013 documentary films
2013 films